Sabia is a genus of small sea snails, limpet-like marine gastropod molluscs in the family Hipponicidae, the hoof shells or hoof snails.

Species
Species within the genus Sabia include:
 Sabia australis Lamarck, 1819
 Sabia conica (Schumacher, 1817)
 Sabia lithedaphus (Reeve, 1842)
Synonyms
 Sabia prionocidaricola Habe & Kanazawa, 1991 (synonym of Hipponix prionocidaricola Habe & Kanazawa, 1991): synonym of Hipponix prionocidaricola (Habe & Kanazawa, 1991) (original combination)
 Sabia wyattae Powell, 1958: synonym of Sabia conica (Schumacher, 1817)

According to Gastropods.com, the following species also belong to the genus Sabia :
 Sabia affine (Jeffreys, 1883)
 Sabia erma (Cotton, B.C., 1939) (taxon inquirendum)

References

External links
 Schumacher, C. F. (1817). Essai d'un nouveau système des habitations des vers testacés. Schultz, Copenghagen. iv + 288 pp., 22 pls.

Hipponicidae